"Spring-Heeled Jim" is a song by British musician Morrissey from his 1994 album Vauxhall and I. The title may well be based upon Spring-heeled Jack, a semi-fantastical character from English folklore, alleged sightings and lurid press reports said to be able to make phenomenal leaps.

The song features several samples from We Are the Lambeth Boys, a 1959 British documentary by Karel Reisz about the daily activities of members of the Alford House Youth Club, Kennington in late 1950s London. The dialogue excerpted is from two conversations, one about a fight between two groups of young men and another about the abolition of the death penalty.

The lyrics of the song seem to be about a man who has gone through his life having lots of sex, but not 'slowing down' to embrace romance with one person. The lyric 'He'll "do" but never be "done to", as well as the usual crude sexual imagery common to Morrissey songs suggests the man refuses to let his lovers penetrate his emotional self. "Well it's the normal thing to do"; some men don't believe emotional intimacy is needed or something in their comfort zone so they have only shallow relationships. The song ends on its last verse with the man in old age wondering "where did all the time go?". 

Song recordings produced by Steve Lillywhite
Songs written by Morrissey
Morrissey songs
1994 songs
Songs written by Boz Boorer